The Jusa Mountains are a minor range in southeastern South Korea. They run parallel to and immediately west of the Taebaek Mountains.  Notable peaks include Danseok Mountain, which is part of Gyeongju National Park.  The Jusa Mountains separate the Hyeongsan River basin on the east from the Geumho River basin on the west.

See also
Geography of South Korea
Gyeongju

Mountains of South Korea